= Sani Mohammed Aliyu Rano =

Nigerian politician

Member of the House of Representatives
- In office 2015–2019
- Constituency: Rano/Kibiya/Bunkure Federal Constituency

Personal details
- Born: Kano State, Nigeria
- Party: Peoples Democratic Party (PDP)
- Occupation: Politician

Sani Mohammed Aliyu Rano is a Nigerian politician from Kano State, Nigeria. He represented the Rano/Kibiya/Bunkure Federal Constituency in the National Assembly as a member of the House of Representatives. He was elected under the banner of the Peoples Democratic Party (PDP) and served from 2015 to 2019.
